Homaabad, also known as Homabad or Hamabad or Hamamabad or Humabad, may refer to:
 Homaabad-e Olya